Colletotrichum higginsianum is a plant pathogen.

References

External links

higginsianum
Fungal plant pathogens and diseases
Fungi described in 1917